Shuttleworth is a hamlet at the northeastern extremity of the Metropolitan Borough of Bury, in Greater Manchester, England. Effectively a suburb of Ramsbottom, the M66 motorway divides Shuttleworth from the main core of that town.

Historically a part of Lancashire, the name Shuttleworth derives from the Old English scyttels and worth meaning a gated enclosure. The first element refers to a bar. It was documented as Suttelsworth in 1227 and Shuttelesworthe in 1296. 
 
During the Middle Ages, Shuttleworth lay within the township of Walmersley (sometimes called Walmersley-cum-Shuttleworth), parish of Bury, and hundred of Salford. Following the Local Government Act 1894, the area became a civil parish, but in 1933  was dissolved and amalgamated into the Ramsbottom Urban District.

Shuttleworth is bounded to the south by Holcombe Brook and Summerseat; to the north by Edenfield, Irwell Vale; to the west by Holcombe and Ramsbottom and to the east by Stubbins, Turn Village and Shuttleworth-cum-Turn.

In the 1990s, Manchester drag queen Foo Foo Lammar lived in Shuttleworth.

References

Notes

Bibliography

Villages in Greater Manchester
Geography of the Metropolitan Borough of Bury
Ramsbottom